Marcedusa is an Arbëreshë comune and town in the province of Catanzaro in the Calabria region of Italy.

Notes and references

Arbëresh settlements
Cities and towns in Calabria